The 1974 Tulane Green Wave football team was an American football team that represented Tulane University during the 1974 NCAA Division I football season as an independent. In their fourth year under head coach Bennie Ellender, the team compiled a 5–6 record.

Schedule

Notes

References

Tulane
Tulane Green Wave football seasons
Tulane Green Wave football